Michael J. Cima is an American materials scientist and engineer and the David H. Koch Professor at Massachusetts Institute of Technology

Cima was elected a member of the National Academy of Engineering in 2011 for innovations in rapid prototyping, high-temperature superconductors, and biomedical device technology. 

His current research focuses on nano-based drugs, detection and monitoring, and personalized medicine.

Cima earned a B.S. in chemistry in 1982 (Phi Beta Kappa) and a Ph.D. in chemical engineering in 1986, both from the University of California, Berkeley.

References

Year of birth missing (living people)
Living people
MIT School of Engineering faculty
American materials scientists
UC Berkeley College of Chemistry alumni